Atrichozancla phaeocrossis is a moth in the family Lecithoceridae. It was described by Edward Meyrick in 1937. It is found in South Africa.

References

Endemic moths of South Africa
Moths described in 1937
Atrichozancla